Helicobolomyces is a genus of lichenized fungi in the family Arthoniaceae. This is a monotypic genus, containing the single species Helicobolomyces lichenicola.

References

Arthoniaceae
Lichen genera
Arthoniomycetes genera